The St. Margaret Mary Church is part of the Roman Catholic Archdiocese of Omaha. The limestone church with High Gothic bell tower is prominently situated on a ridge overlooking Elmwood Creek along the original route of the Lincoln Highway, today known as U.S. Route 6 in the Fairacres Historic District. Adjacent to Memorial Park (Omaha) and the University of Nebraska Omaha it is widely known for its display of an enshrined relic of St Margaret Mary Alacoque, the French Catholic Visitation nun and mystic who promoted devotion to the Sacred Heart of Jesus.

History
The first mass was held at 8 am on Sunday, September 7, 1919 in the dance hall above Ernest Buffett’s (Warren Buffett’s grandfather) grocery store. The new parish remained unnamed until the canonization of St Margaret Mary Alacoque on Ascension Thursday, May 13, 1920, by Pope Benedict XV. On that same day, Archbishop Jeremiah J Harty placed the young parish under this new saint's protection.

Architecture
In 1941, Fr. Joseph A Suneg commissioned Leo A Daly, the firm whose many credits include the Cathedral of Our Lady of the Angels and the National World War II Memorial, to design the Rural English Gothic church. Parson's Construction Company began work the autumn before Japan’s attack on Pearl Harbor and just 9 months later on June 14, 1942 the dedication mass was celebrated.

With a floorplan of 44′ × 132′ the church is the same dimensions as Solomon’s Temple in Jerusalem.  In 1952, Italian artist Sirio Tonelli installed his reproduction of "The Frieze of the Prophets" by American portraitist John Singer Sargent on the sanctuary wall. The stained glass windows were designed by the famed Charles Jay Connick studio of Boston. In conformity with its Gothic character, a foliate disgorging Green Man adorns the north exterior wall beneath the rose window.

At least six other churches have been modeled after this Daly design including St Mary’s of Omaha, St Patrick’s of North Platte (NE), St Ann’s of Vail (IA), St Philip Neri of Omaha, St Paul’s Lutheran of West Allis (WI), and Cloister’s on the Platte of Gretna (NE).

In 1963, the iconic 112-foot-tall Leo A Daly-designed High Gothic bell tower was dedicated by Archbishop Gerald Thomas Bergan in memory of attorney Daniel J Gross. The belfry includes four bronze bells. The largest at 6,052 lbs. (tone “B flat”) was cast by the McShane Bell Foundry in 1885. It was salvaged from the Cathedral of the Immaculate Conception in the Roman Catholic Diocese of Leavenworth, Kansas, after a catastrophic fire in 1962.

In 2017, the former baptistery was converted into a Eucharistic Adoration chapel.

Parish school
In 1920, the first classes were held in a parish house at 5002 California Street. By 1922 a new combination school/church was opened next door at 608 N 50th Street. It wasn't until 1951 that the school moved to its current location at 123 N 61st Street. Leo A Daly designed an edifice architecturally inspired by the Cotswolds region of central-southwest England. In 2008 it was recognized as a "National Blue Ribbon School Program" by the U.S. Department of Education.

First-class relic
Inside the church, a first-class relic of St. Margaret Mary Alacoque is permanently ensconced in a reliquary at the base of the statue bearing her likeness. A March 26, 1955 document of authenticity signed by the Chaplain of the Visitation of St. Mary at Paray-le-Monial, Roman Catholic Diocese of Autun, France, certifies that “…authentic parcels of the ashes of St. Margaret Mary have been deposited and enshrined within a silver reliquary, adorned with a metal crown of thorns, round in shape, with a glass on its anterior face, closed with cords of red silk and sealed with the seal of the said monastery affixed once, on red wax of Spain.”

Winter solstice
On December 21st each year at 7:46 am CST a winter solstice viewing takes place on the east lawn where the award-winning 1927 bronze statue of St. Francis of Assisi, entitled “The Canticle of the Sun” by Professor Arturo Tomagnini of Turin, aligns perfectly with the rising sun.

References

Roman Catholic churches in Nebraska
20th-century Roman Catholic church buildings in the United States
Roman Catholic Archdiocese of Omaha
English Gothic architecture
Roman Catholic churches completed in 1942
Roman Catholic churches completed in the 1940s